Le Click was a German Eurodance duo. The duo consisted of Swedish/Nigerian singer Kayo Shekoni and rapper/singer Robert Haynes.

Career
Their U.S. chart debut was in 1995 with "Tonight Is the Night" (which featured La Bouche's Melanie Thornton on vocals and was included on the double platinum-selling U.S. edition of La Bouche's debut album Sweet Dreams). They had another hit in 1997 with the single "Call Me", which climbed to number 35 on the Billboard Hot 100 as well as number 4 on the Billboard Hot Dance Club Play chart. The track reached number 38 in the UK Singles Chart. Its follow-up, "Don't Go" peaked at number 62 on the Billboard Hot 100 and number 19 on the Billboard Dance Club Play Chart. Their album, Tonight Is the Night peaked at number 49 on the Heatseekers chart.

The lead singer Shekoni was already an established artist in her native Sweden, and has since gone on to have a successful television career. She has released two solo albums and many hit singles in Sweden, both in either English or Swedish. In 1998, she released the single "If I Can't Have You" with LFO. Shekoni was the Swedish Eurovision Song Contest 2002 entrant with the group Afro-dite. Her most recent English single was released in 2006 on Redlox Music titled, "(If It Makes You) Feel Good".

Discography

Studio albums

Singles

Music video

References

External links
- Kayo's official website
The Eurodance Encyclopaedia - Le Click

German dance music groups
German Eurodance groups
German musical duos
Musical groups from Frankfurt
English-language singers from Sweden